The following is a list of Agriculture Commissioners of North Dakota since 1966 when the office was established. Prior to 1966, the office was combined with the North Dakota Commissioner of Labor and was called the North Dakota Commissioner of Agriculture and Labor. The holders of that office can be found at the List of North Dakota Commissioners of Agriculture and Labor. Commissioners from Dahl to Vogel were officially known as Commissioners of Agriculture, while commissioners Johnson and those to follow are known as Agriculture Commissioners. This is due to a change of title that was voted on in 1996. Agriculture Commissioners serve four-year terms.

See also
North Dakota Agriculture Commissioner
List of North Dakota Commissioners of Agriculture and Labor.

Agriculture Commissioner